Whoscall is a mobile application that offers caller identification services. It was developed by Gogolook Co., Ltd., a Taiwanese design team.  Whoscall identifies incoming calls, blocks scam/harassment numbers, and filters spam text messages. Its name is derived from a shorter version of "Who is calling?".  The app currently has over 90 million users and is available in 31 countries/regions, including Taiwan, Korea, Hong Kong, Japan, Thailand, Malaysia, and Brazil.
The application owns the largest number database in Southeast Asia. It is the strategic partner of several governmental agencies in anti-fraud efforts, including the  National Police Agency (Taiwan), the Financial Supervisory Service (South Korea), Fukuoka City Government., and Police Cyber Taskforce (Thailand).

History and development 
In 2010, the first version of Whoscall was created after one of its co-founders, Jeff Kuo, received a spam call. The app was developed together by Jeff Kuo, Jackie Chang, and Reiny Song as part-time work. Afterward, the three co-founded Gogolook, with the goal of enhancing fraud prevention efforts worldwide by providing a caller identification solution.

In August 2010, the first version of Whoscall was released on Google Play in several countries and attracted voluntary downloads.
In 2011, Whoscall gained traction and propelled itself into the limelight when Google’s CEO, Eric Schmidt on a visit to Taiwan, rated the app: “An app called WhosCall tells you who a strange number is from. It's growing fast in the U.S., India, and China, and it's made in Taiwan.”
In 2013, Gogolook received an investment of $11.7 million from Naver Corporation, LINE’s parent company.
In 2013, Google Play Taiwan awarded Whoscall with its 2013 Innovation Awards.
In the same year, Whoscall was awarded Google Play’s Best Apps of the Year in Taiwan, Hong Kong, Singapore, Philippines, Malaysia, Indonesia, Vietnam, and Thailand.
In 2014, Whoscall iOS version was launched in the App Store.
In 2015, Whoscall was awarded as one of the App Store’s Best Apps of 2015.
In 2015 and 2016, Whoscall was awarded as Google Play’s Best Apps of the Year for two consecutive years.
In 2016, Whoscall signed an MOU with Taiwan’s National Police Agency to strengthen its anti-fraud efforts and help promote anti-fraud education.  As of 2016, Whoscall had 60 million users worldwide.
In 2017, Whoscall signed an MOU with the Financial Supervisory Service (South Korea) and Korean National Police Agency on anti-fraud technical exchange.
In 2017, Whoscall was chosen by Google as a successful case study on the event Google I/O 2017.
In 2019, Taiwan President Tsai Ing-wen visited Gogolook, the developer of Whoscall.
In 2019, Whoscall had 60 million users worldwide.
In 2020, Gogolook, the developer of Whoscall, established its overseas office in Fukuoka, Japan and created partnerships with the Fukuoka City Government in joint anti-fraud efforts.
In 2020, Whoscall released the world’s first COVID-19 Scam White Paper. The release was covered by several media outlets.
In 2020, the application won Taiwan’s 4th Presidential Innovation Award, a recognition of its achievements.
In 2020, Gogolook received investment from WIN Semiconductors Corp., the largest GaAs semiconductor foundry in the world.
In 2021, Whoscall was listed as one of the anti-fraud apps recommended by the Royal Thai Police.
In 2021, Whoscall released the 2020 Annual Report focusing on latest fraud trends and industry insights. 
In 2021, Whoscall launched "Smart SMS Assistant" feature.
In 2021, Whoscall had more than 100 million downloads worldwide.
In 2022, Whoscall released the 2021 Annual Report.
In 2022, Whoscall cooperated with True Corp, the largest telecom company in Thailand, to expand anti-fraud business 
In 2022, Cross-border cooperation with Malaysia Selangor to expand the Southeast Asian market. 
In 2022, Join hands with the Web3 community "Global Citizen Club" to create customized NFT 
In 2022, Jointly released the “Business Impersonation Report” with CIB. 
In 2022, Whoscall launched the "Whoscall Premium Group Sell" on momo shopping online. 
In 2022, Whoscall's parent company, Gogolook, applies for IPO listing on the Innovation Board. 
In 2022, Whoscall partners with Thailand Post to prevent fraud 
In 2023, Signed an MOU with the Royal Malaysian Police to start fraud prevention cooperation

Features 
Instant Caller Identification, which identifies unknown callers in real time through the largest number database (with 1.6 billion entries) and an AI-powered identification engine.

Caller ID Blocking, which reduces the risks of receiving malicious/harassment phone calls by blocking nuisance calls or text messages automatically.

SMS Message Filtering, which filters dangerous phishing text messages by detecting suspicious URLs and keywords.

Unknown Caller Query, which allows users to key in unknown phone numbers manually and identify such callers in the database.

Number Reporting, which maximizes the power of social network by allowing users to report dangerous/scam phone numbers.

Accolades and reception 
Whoscall has been covered in prominent international media including TechCrunch, TechinAsia, and e27. It has many positive reviews and holds an average of 4.2 star ratings on Google Play Store.

Anecdote 
On May 20, 2014, Gogolook was mentioned by name during the President of Taiwan, Ma Ying-jeou's national address marking his 6th year in office. Gogolook was referred to as an example of the creativity and potential of the youth of Taiwan.

In April 2014, concerns regarding Whoscall’s privacy issues rose to the forefront of national attention as public figures took to the press and expressed their concerns with public records including home telephone numbers and addresses showing up on incoming calling screens. Gogolook swiftly came out with a statement declaring that they had never collected nor stored any personal information on their servers, let alone made them publicly available. It was soon discovered that the personal information of the aforementioned public figures was leaked from government servers with poor security protocols that made the information available on search engines, from where Gogolook sources some of their information. Whoscall was promptly lauded as not only a call screen for telemarketers, but also a reliable reminder for the possible dissemination of personal information.

References 

 For what reason is it imperative to discover who called
2010 software
Spam filtering
Windows Phone software